Hathor 21 - Coptic Calendar - Hathor 23 

The twenty-second day of the Coptic month of Hathor, the third month of the Coptic year. On a common year, this day corresponds to November 18, of the Julian Calendar, and December 1, of the Gregorian Calendar. This day falls in the Coptic season of Peret, the season of emergence. This day falls in the Nativity Fast.

Commemorations

Saints 

 The martyrdom of Saints Cosmas, Damian, their Brothers and their Mother

References 

Days of the Coptic calendar